Veerannapalem is a small village and a panchyat located in the Parchur mandal of the Prakasam district, in the state of Andhra Pradesh, India.
It is used to be a village in the Guntur district, but in 1970 became part of the Prakasam district.

Political View
The village comes under the Assembly Constituency of Parchur and the Parliament(Loksabha) segment of Bapatla

Geography 

History 
In the approximate period of 1600–1700 AD, a man named Veeranna started living at an unnamed place near his fields; the place became a village named after him.

There are two large ponds in the village, the main source of drinking water; In 2008 a drinking water plant began providing clean drinking water in addition to the water plant served earlier. The main occupation in the village is agriculture.

References 

Villages in Prakasam district